Farley is an unincorporated community in Mendocino County, California.

A post office operated at Farley from 1915 to 1942. The name honors Jackson Farley, a settler of 1857.

References

Unincorporated communities in California
Unincorporated communities in Mendocino County, California
1915 establishments in California